SM UB-17 was a German Type UB I submarine or U-boat in the German Imperial Navy during World War I. The submarine disappeared during a patrol in March 1918.

UB-17 was ordered in November 1914 and was laid down at the AG Weser shipyard in Bremen in February 1915. She carried two torpedoes for her two bow torpedo tubes and was also armed with a deck-mounted machine gun. UB-17 was broken into sections and shipped by rail to Antwerp for reassembly. She was launched in April 1915 and commissioned as SM UB-17 in May.

UB-17 spent her entire career in the Flanders Flotilla and sank 13 ships, most of them British fishing vessels. She also captured two ships as prizes and damaged one tanker. On 11 March 1918, UB-17 departed for a patrol in the Hoofden but was never seen again. There have been several suggestions as to UB-17s fate, but none match the U-boat's operation details.

In July 2013, UB-17 was found off England's east coast, near the county of Suffolk by archaeologists.

Design and construction 
After the German Army's rapid advance along the North Sea coast in the earliest stages of World War I, the German Imperial Navy found itself without suitable submarines that could be operated in the narrow and shallow seas off Flanders. Project 34, a design effort begun in mid-August 1914, produced the Type UB I design: a small submarine that could be shipped by rail to a port of operations and quickly assembled.

UB-17 and sister boat  comprised an order of two submarines ordered on 25 November from AG Weser of Bremen, a little more than three months after planning for the class began. UB-17 was laid down by Weser in Bremen on 21 February 1915. She had a single  Körting 4-cylinder diesel engine for surface travel, and a single  Siemens-Schuckert electric motor for underwater travel, both attached to a single propeller shaft.

UB-17 was armed with two  torpedoes in two bow torpedo tubes. She was also outfitted for a single  machine gun on deck. UB-17s standard complement consisted of one officer and thirteen enlisted men.

After work on UB-17 was complete at the Weser yard, she was readied for rail shipment. The process of shipping a UB I boat involved breaking the submarine down into what was essentially a knock down kit. Each boat was broken into approximately fifteen pieces and loaded onto eight railway flatcars. In early 1915, the sections of UB-17 were shipped to Antwerp for assembly in what was typically a two- to three-week process. After UB-17 was assembled and launched on 21 April, she was loaded on a barge and taken through canals to Bruges where she underwent trials.

Early career 
The submarine was commissioned into the German Imperial Navy as SM UB-17 on 4 May 1915 under the command of Kapitänleutnant (Kapt.) On 10 May, UB-17 joined the Flanders Flotilla, which had been organized on 29 March. When UB-17 joined the flotilla, Germany was in the midst of its first submarine offensive, begun in February. During this campaign, enemy vessels in the German-defined war zone, which encompassed all waters around the United Kingdom, were to be sunk. Vessels of neutral countries were not to be attacked unless they definitively could be identified as enemy vessels operating under a false flag.

On 18 July, Wenninger torpedoed the British tanker Batoum just off the Southwold lighthouse. Early the next month, on 6 August, Wenninger and UB-17 sank four British fishing vessels while patrolling in the Yarmouth–Lowestoft area. All four of the sunken ships were smacks—sailing vessels traditionally rigged with red ochre sails—which were stopped, boarded by crewmen from UB-17, and sunk with explosives.

On 18 August, the chief of the Admiralstab, Admiral Henning von Holtzendorff, issued orders suspending the first offensive in response to American demands after German submarines had sunk the Cunard Line steamer  in May 1915 and other high-profile sinkings in August and September. Holtzendorff's directive ordered all U-boats out of the English Channel and the South-Western Approaches and required that all submarine activity in the North Sea be conducted strictly along prize regulations. Six days later, UB-17 seized the Belgian sailing vessel Leon Mathilde as a prize off Ostend.

There was only one survivor from the 303 GRT ship's eighteen-man crew. Three months later, Wenninger misidentified the 71 GRT French fishing ship Jesus Maria as a destroyer. UB-17 launched a torpedo which struck the ship and killed all six men of Jesus Marias crew.

On 31 January 1916, in the Lowestoft–Aldeburgh area, UB-17 sank an additional four fishing ships: three British, and one Belgian. The next day, UB-17s war journal ( or ) records the torpedoing of the 957 GRT British steamer Franz Fischer off the Kentish Knock. British records list the cargo ship as being sunk by bombs from a zeppelin. Franz Fischer was the last ship sunk with Wenninger in command. On 7 February, he was relieved by Oberleutnant zur See (Oblt.) Arthur Metz for a month, Kapt. Werner Fürbringer for a week, and Oblt. Friedrich Moecke for another month. Wenninger resumed command on 16 April.

In the meantime, Germany had begun its second submarine offensive against merchant shipping at the end of February in reaction to the British blockade of Germany. By early 1916, the British blockade was having an effect on Germany and her imports. The Royal Navy had stopped and seized more cargo destined for Germany than the quantity of cargo sunk by German U-boats in the first submarine offensive. UB-17 sank no ships during this offensive, which was called off near the end of April by Admiral Reinhardt Scheer, the commander-in-chief of the High Seas Fleet.

Grand Fleet ambush attempts 
In mid-May, Scheer completed plans to draw out part of the British Grand Fleet. The German High Seas Fleet would sortie for a raid on Sunderland, luring the British fleet across nests' of submarines and mine-fields". This group was to intercept and attack the British light forces from Harwich, should they sortie north to join the battle. Unfortunately for the Germans, the British Admiralty had intelligence reports of the departure of the submarines which, coupled with an absence of attacks on shipping, aroused British suspicions.

A delayed departure of the German High Seas Fleet for its sortie (which had been redirected to the Skagerrak) and the failure of several of the U-boats stationed to the north to receive the coded message warning of the British advance caused Scheer's anticipated ambush to be a "complete and disappointing failure". In UB-16s group, only UB-10 sighted the Harwich forces, and they were too far away to mount an attack. The failure of the submarine ambush to sink any British capital ships allowed the full Grand Fleet to engage the numerically inferior High Seas Fleet in the Battle of Jutland, which took place 31 May – 1 June.

Wenninger left UB-17 for good on 27 June and was succeeded by Kapt. Günther Suadicani, who commanded the boat for just under two weeks. He was followed by Oblt. Hans Degetau, who commanded the boat from July to December. Under Degetau's leadership, UB-17 added another ship to her tally when she captured and sank the Dutch ship Zeearend on 1 September. The 462 GRT steamer was en route to London from Rotterdam with a cargo of piece goods when she was sunk  from the Mass Lightship. UB-17s next success was the capture of the Norwegian steamer Birgit in the Hoofden area under the command of Kapt. Ulrich Meier, who had taken command on 4 December. Birgit was the last success for UB-17 for the next twelve months.

Conversion to minelayer 

UB-17 and three sister boats, UB-10, UB-12, and UB-16, were all converted to minelaying submarines by 1918. The conversion involved removing the bow section containing the pair of torpedo tubes from each U-boat and replacing it with a new bow containing four mine chutes capable of carrying two mines each. Exactly when this conversion was performed on UB-17 is not reported, but UB-17 was at the dockyard from November 1916 to January 1917, and it is possible UB-17 was converted during this same timeframe.

While Meier remained in command of UB-17, Kaiser Wilhelm II personally approved a resumption of unrestricted submarine warfare to begin on 1 February 1917 to help force the British to make peace. Although the new rules of engagement specified that no ship was to be left afloat, UB-17 did not contribute to the effort until December 1917, when she captured and sank a single fishing smack off Aldeburgh under the direction of Oblt. Johannes Ries. In January 1918, Ries was replaced by Oblt. Albert Branscheid.

Sinking 
On 11 March 1918, Branscheid led UB-17 out from Zeebrugge for a patrol in the Hoofden and the U-boat was never seen again. One postwar account tells of two British seaplanes that bombed a U-boat in the North Sea on 12 March, but, according to author Dwight Messimer, the account provides no details to support the claim. Messimer also discounts an account that attributes UB-17s sinking to British destroyer  on 25 February south of Portland by pointing out that UB-17 was in port in Zeebrugge on that date. Whatever the specific cause of UB-17s demise, all eighteen crewmen on board the submarine were killed.

Discovery
In July 2013, archaeologists found the remains of 44 submarines, including UB-17, off the United Kingdom's southern and east coasts, near the county of Suffolk. The find was made up mostly of vessels from the German Imperial Navy dating to World War I. Der Spiegel reported divers located 41 German U-boats, and three of English submarines, found at depths of up to 50 feet, off England's southern and eastern coasts.

Summary of raiding history

Notes

References

Bibliography 

 

 
 
 
 
 
 
 
 
 

German Type UB I submarines
Ships built in Bremen (state)
Ships built in Belgium
U-boats commissioned in 1915
World War I submarines of Germany
U-boats sunk in 1918